Cenotaph in Východná village was built in honour of killed soldiers, who took part in World War I and World War II in the name of Východná village.

Military monuments and memorials
Monuments and memorials in Slovakia
Vychodna